Thomas Hazeltine McDill (July 18, 1815January 14, 1889) was an American businessman, Republican politician, and pioneer of Portage County, Wisconsin.  He served four years in the Wisconsin State Assembly, representing Portage County.

Biography
Thomas McDill was born in Crawford County, Pennsylvania, in July 1815.  He received a common school education there and moved to the Wisconsin Territory in 1840, working as a lumberman at Mill Creek.  He built the first sawmill on the Eau Claire River, near what's now Wausau, Wisconsin, in 1842.  By 1844, a larger number of lumbermen had moved to the area, and he decided to sell the mill to open a hotel to take advantage of the influx of new residents.  He set up his hotel at the nearby village of Plover, which was then the county seat of Portage County.

His hotel business brought him into local politics, and in 1847 he was appointed sheriff of Portage County by Governor Henry Dodge.  He was subsequently elected to a full term in the position in 1848, and served as sheriff until he was elected county treasurer in 1856.  That year, his younger brother, Dr. Alexander S. McDill, came to join him at Plover.  Together, they opened a general store, operated a sawmill, and engaged in the lumber trade.

During the American Civil War, he served as an assistant quartermaster for the Union Army with the rank of captain.

After the war, he was elected to the Wisconsin State Assembly for the 1867 session.  He was not a candidate for re-election, but returned to office in 1871.  In 1876, he was a candidate for the Wisconsin State Senate, but lost to Henry Mumbrue.  He went on to serve two more terms in the Assembly in 1879 and 1880.  During this time, he also served as chairman of the town board and served eight years as chairman of the county board.

In 1870, McDill and his brother sold their businesses in Plover, and moved to the village of McDill, which had been named for him.  He maintained his interests in the lumber business until his death.  He died in Chicago on January 14, 1889.

Personal life and family
Thomas McDill was a son of James McDill, an Irish American immigrant who served in the Pennsylvania Militia during the War of 1812.  McDill's younger brother, Alexander S. McDill, served as a U.S. congressman and was superintendent of the State Hospital for the Insane.  His nephew, George Davis McDill, served in the Iron Brigade of the Army of the Potomac and served three terms in the State Assembly.

Thomas McDill married Mary Ruth Harris on February 7, 1849.  They had three children together and adopted a foster son.  Their son, George Edward McDill, also became a prominent businessman and politician in Portage County and was chairman of the Republican Party of Wisconsin.

References

External links
 

People from Crawford County, Pennsylvania
People from Plover, Wisconsin
Republican Party members of the Wisconsin State Assembly
Wisconsin city council members
County supervisors in Wisconsin
County treasurers in Wisconsin
County judges in the United States
People of Wisconsin in the American Civil War
Union Army officers
1815 births
1889 deaths
19th-century American politicians
19th-century American judges
Military personnel from Pennsylvania